Thymidine kinase 1, soluble (gene name TK1), is a human thymidine kinase.

Two forms of this protein have been identified in animal cells, one in cytosol and one in mitochondria. Activity of the cytosolic enzyme is high in proliferating cells and peaks during the S-phase of the cell cycle; it is very low in resting cells.

Interactions 

Thymidine kinase 1 has been shown to interact with P21.

Interactive pathway map

Thymidine Kinase 1 in Cancer 
Elevations in serum TK-1 have been found to correlate with the return of breast and other forms of cancer TK-1 can be used to detect cancer earlier, determine what stage it is in, and detect recurrence. Thymidine Kinase 1 can be measured based on its enzyme activity or using immunoassay.

References

Further reading